Prem Ya Paheli – Chandrakanta is an Indian Hindi language fantasy television show, produced and directed by Nikhil Sinha.

The show stars Kritika Kamra and Gaurav Khanna in lead roles. The show is produced by Triangle Film Company and is inspired on the popular 1888 Hindi novel Chandrakanta by Devaki Nandan Khatri. The dialogue writer for the show is Shailesh Pratap singh The show telecasted on Life OK from 4 March 2017 on Saturday-Sunday at 9 pm. First promo of the show was released on 8 February 2017. A special sequence of the show was also shot at the Golkonda Fort in Hyderabad. Show went off-air abruptly on 27 August 2017.

Plot 
The show is inspired from the novel Chandrakanta. The show starts when a King gets successful in possessing all the powers of the world and store those powers and locks to secure the powers from anyone trying to steal the powers. He and his wife died after a King attacked them'. After 100 years of this incident, The King and his wife are reborn. The show now follows the story of Prince and Princess falling in love and rediscovering the Tilism. In spite of facing a lot of trouble, created by Prince Shivdutt who is considered as the rightful owner of the "Tilism".

Cast
 Kritika Kamra as Princess Chandrakanta / Maharani Chandrika
 Gaurav Khanna as Prince Virendra Singh / Maharaj Harshvardhan
 Sudesh Berry as Marich
 Ankit Arora as Crown Prince Shivdutt
 Iris Maity as Bichhoo Kanya Shyamala / Rajkumari Taramati
 Chandan K Anand as Kroor Singh
 Harsh Vashisht as Maharaj Jai Singh
 Gungun Uprari as Maharani Ratnagarbha
 Sandeep Mohan as Maharaj Surendra Singh
 Jaswinder Gardner as Maharani Padvika
 Manasvi Vyas as Maharani Kamini
 Puneet Vashisht as Badrinath
 Jitendra Bohara as Aiyyar Nazim
 Abhishek Avasthi as Aiyyar Ahmed
 Sumit Arora as Aiyyar Zakir
 Bibriti Chatterjee as Aiyyara Chapla
 Sonal Shrotriya as Aiyyara Champa
 Shailesh Datar as Pandit Jagannath
 Rohit Choudhary as Prince Jai Aditya
 Sunny Sachdeva as Aiyyar Devgiri
 Nikunj Malik as Soundarya
 Patrali Chattopadhyay as Parijaat
 Rahul Trivedi as Jhumroo
 Abhilash Chaudhary as Yakshraj Param
 Michelle Shah as Yakshini Siyali / Mansi
 Zeeshan Ahmed Khan/Ankur Nayyar as Tej Singh

References

External links

Indian fantasy television series
Life OK original programming
Hindi-language television shows
2017 Indian television series debuts
2017 Indian television series endings
Television shows based on Indian novels